Jacinto Germán Navarrete Rodríguez (born 1 August 1962) is a retired Colombian athlete who competed in middle-distance and cross-country  events. He represented his country at two World Indoor Championships and currently holds the South American record in the indoor 3000 metres.

Competition record

Personal bests
Outdoor
1500 metres – 3:43.22 (Maia 1995)
5000 metres – 13:49.40 (Cali 1995)
10 kilometers – 28:37 (Plant City 1989) NR
15 kilometers – 43:09 (Tampa 1989) NR
Half Marathon – 1:08:56 (Guayaquil 2003)
Indoor
Mile – 3:59.87 (Moscow 1987)
3000 metres – 7:49.46 (Seville 1991) AR
Two miles – 8:29.0 (San Diego 1987)

References

All-Athletics profile
EQUIPO PACER COLOMBIA

1962 births
Living people
Colombian male middle-distance runners
Colombian male long-distance runners
South American Games gold medalists for Colombia
South American Games silver medalists for Colombia
South American Games medalists in athletics
Competitors at the 1994 South American Games
Central American and Caribbean Games gold medalists for Colombia
Competitors at the 1986 Central American and Caribbean Games
Central American and Caribbean Games medalists in athletics
Washington State Cougars men's track and field athletes
Colombian sports coaches
Athletics (track and field) coaches
20th-century Colombian people
21st-century Colombian people